Anand  is a 1971 Indian Hindi-language drama film co-written and directed by Hrishikesh Mukherjee, with dialogues written by Gulzar. It stars Rajesh Khanna in the lead role, with a supporting cast including Amitabh Bachchan, Sumita Sanyal, Ramesh Deo and Seema Deo.

The film won several awards, including the Filmfare Award for Best Film in 1972. In 2013, it was listed in Anupama Chopra's book 100 Films To See before You Die.  Anand is counted among the 17 consecutive box office successes of Rajesh Khanna between 1969 and 1971, adding the multistarrers Maryada (1971) and Andaz (1971). The film was a modest success at box office. But it has since gained a cult following and is hailed as one of the greatest Hindi films ever made. Indiatimes listed it among the "25 must watch films Bollywood movies". Anand is one of the only two films that Khanna and Bachchan have starred together– the other being the 1973 film Namak Haraam, which was also directed by Hrishikesh Mukherjee.

Plot 
At an award ceremony in Mumbai for his first book, 'Anand' , Dr. Bhaskar Banerjee is asked to speak about the book. Bhaskar says that the book has been written based on his diary excerpts when he met Anand and narrates to the audience his experience with him.

Bhaskar, an oncologist, treats the poor for no charge but is often disheartened by the fact that he cannot cure all the ailments in the world. He becomes pessimistic after seeing the suffering, illness, and poverty all around him. He is straightforward and won't treat the imaginary ailments of the rich. His friend, Dr. Prakash Kulkarni, follows a slightly different path. He treats the imaginary illnesses of the rich and uses that money to treat the poor.

One day, Kulkarni introduces Bhaskar to Anand, who has lymphosarcoma of the intestine, a rare type of cancer. Anand has a cheerful nature and despite knowing the truth that he is not going to survive for more than six months, he maintains a nonchalant demeanor and always tries to make everyone around him happy. His cheerful and vibrant nature soothes Bhaskar, who has a contrasting nature and they become good friends.
Anand has the rare quality of attracting people and befriending them. In one such encounter, he makes Isa Bhai, a theater actor, his friend. They enjoy each other's company and create an emotional bond.

Anand's condition gradually deteriorates, but he does not want to spend his remaining days in a hospital bed; he, instead, roams freely and helps everyone. He discovers that Bhaskar has strong feelings for Renu, whom he had treated previously for pneumonia. He helps Bhaskar express his love and convinces Renu's mother to bless their marriage. He tells Bhaskar that everyone should remember him as a lively person and not as a cancer patient. It is also discovered that he loved a girl back in Delhi who is now married to someone else because of Anand's illness. The day she got married, Anand came to Mumbai from Delhi to move on from her but keeps a flower in his book in her memory. Anand becomes sicker and sicker with time and is now bound to the house. He records Bhasker saying a poem and himself delivering dialogue and both of them laughing together on tape. He is counting his last breaths as his friends gather around him but Bhasker is gone to bring medicines for him. He shouts for him and dies. Bhasker comes back just a few minutes later and begs Anand to speak to him. Suddenly, the tape starts playing with Anand's voice and his friends cry for him. A couple of balloons are seen flying away in the sky as Anand leaves the world and flies away in the sky.

Cast 
 Rajesh Khanna as Anand Sehgal / Jaichand (die.2012)
 Amitabh Bachchan as Dr. Bhaskar Banerjee a.k.a. Babu Moshai / Munna
 Sumita Sanyal as Renu Bhaskar Banerjee (die.2017)
 Ramesh Deo as Dr. Prakash Kulkarni (die.2022)
 Seema Deo as Suman Kulkarni
 Lalita Pawar as Matron D'Sa (die.1998)
 Durga Khote as Renu's mother (die.1991)
 Johnny Walker as Isa Bhai Suratwala / Morarilal (die.2003)
 Asit Sen (actor)|Asit Sen]] as Chandra Nath (die.1993)
 Dev Kishan as Raghu Kaka 
 Dara Singh as Wrestling Coach aka Papaji (die.2012)
 Brahm Bhardwaj as Mauni Baba

Production 
Mukherjee was loosely inspired by Ikiru, and initially considered Shashi Kapoor and his brother Raj Kapoor for the lead role in the early 1960s. The character of Anand was inspired by Raj Kapoor, who used to call Mukherjee "Babu Moshay". It is believed that Mukherjee wrote the film when once Kapoor was seriously ill and Mukherjee thought that he may die. The film was dedicated to Kapoor and the people of Mumbai.

Later, Mukherjee thought of making the film in Bengali language, with Uttam Kumar as Babu Moshai. When this plan also failed, he considered Kishore Kumar and Mehmood (as Babu Moshai) in lead roles. One of the producers, N. C. Sippy, had earlier served as Mehmood's production manager. Mukherjee was asked to meet Kishore Kumar to discuss the project. However, when he went to Kishore Kumar's residence, he was driven away by the gatekeeper due to a misunderstanding. Kishore Kumar (himself a Bengali) was involved in a financial dispute with a Bengali event manager over a stage show. He had instructed his gatekeeper to drive away this "Bengali", if he ever visited the house. The gatekeeper mistook Hrishikesh Mukherjee to be this "Bengali", and refused him entry. The incident hurt Mukherjee and he decided not to work with Kumar. Consequently, Mehmood had to leave the film as well. According to Dharmendra, he was also considered for the lead role before it went to Rajesh Khanna. As a playback singer, Kishore Kumar had become the preferred voice for Khanna by this time, but Anand did not have any song by him.

Hrishikesh Mukherjee shot the film in 28 days. The screenplay of Anand was written by Gulzar (who also wrote the dialogue and the lyrics of a few songs), Bimal Dutt, D.N. Mukherjee and Hrishikesh Mukherjee.

Later, Anand was remade in Malayalam, with the name Chitrashalabham.

Music 
The musical score and songs were composed by Salil Chowdhary.  One of the songs, "Kahin Door Jaab Din Dhal Jaye" was originally composed as a Bengali song 20 years prior, "Amay proshno kare" and the original sung in Bengali by him is available on YouTube.

The lyrics were written by Gulzar and Yogesh. Gulzar wrote the poem "Maut Tu Ek Kavita Hai", which is narrated by Amitabh Bachchan.

Before confirming Chowdhary for songs, Mukherjee approached Lata Mangeshkar to get the songs composed, as she had already worked as a music director in Marathi films under the pseudonym of "Anandghan". She, however, politely refused the offer and decided to sing the songs in the film rather than composing them.

Awards

Home media
Numerous DVD editions entered the market by companies like "Digital Entertainment Inc.", Shemaroo Entertainment and "Eagle Home Video". These were released as non-restored, non-re-mastered editions and bare-bones, devoid of supplementary features.

Eagle Home Video came out with a restored edition on Blu-ray, preserving the original aspect ratio in 4:3 pillar box and a DTS Master Audio (HD) in 2.0. The restoration took place in Shemaroo Studios.

Impact
Till the time of the release of Anand, the star of the film, Amitabh Bachchan, was not recognized in public. Sharing the incident on Twitter, a fan-Aashish Palod reminded him of how he got recognition from the film. On the release day of the film, Bachchan went to a petrol pump to fill up the tank of his car and no one recognized him. But, after the release of the film in the evening, when he went to the same petrol pump for a refill, the public started identifying him. Bachchan posted on Twitter, "this is a true happenstance .. it was the petrol pump at Irla, on SV Road."

References

Further reading

External links 
 
 

1971 films
1971 drama films
1970s buddy drama films
1970s Hindi-language films
Films directed by Hrishikesh Mukherjee
Indian films about cancer
Indian buddy drama films
Hindi films remade in other languages
Urdu films remade in other languages
Films with screenplays by Gulzar
Films scored by Salil Chowdhury
Best Hindi Feature Film National Film Award winners
Hindi-language drama films